Ashley Sibelius Peacock  is a fictional character from the British ITV soap opera Coronation Street. Portrayed by Steven Arnold, the character first appeared on screen during the episode airing on 1 February 1995. Ashley was a victim of the tram crash and died as part of the show's 50th-anniversary episode in December 2010.

Storylines

Backstory
Ashley is the son of Fred Elliott (John Savident) and Kathleen Gutteridge (Elizabeth Rider). He was conceived when his father had a relationship with Kathleen who was an employee at his family's shop. Fred proposed to Kathleen, wanting to provide stability for his son but Kathleen rejected his proposal as she did not want to be tied down at a young age. When Ashley was born, Kathleen agreed to let Fred's sister Beryl Peacock (Anny Tobin) and her husband Sam, raise Ashley as their own son. Ashley grew up believing Fred was his uncle and Beryl was his mother.

1995–2010
Ashley is first seen doing bicycle deliveries for his uncle, Fred, from his butcher's shop. Fred sends Ashley to Rita Sullivan (Barbara Knox) with a parcel of rump steak. Rita doesn't want it as she doesn't want to be obligated to Fred. Jamie does his puncture trick on Ashley's bike and is paid again. Kelly Thomson (Sarah Moffett) is pleased to see Ashley, her old school friend. She gives him a cup of tea and is pleased to discover that he's not going out with anyone. She tells him that his old girlfriend Margaret was two timing him all the time. She is embarrassed when Sally Webster (Sally Dynevor) matchmakes between them. Ashley and Kelly arrange to have a date in The Rovers, both terribly shy of actually asking the other out. Ashley feels bold enough to kiss Kelly but runs off in case Fred catches him. Ashley tells Judy that Fred intends to sell the horse for horsemeat. Ashley and Kelly plan to spend the night together at No.1 in Ken Barlow's (William Roache) absence. Ashley spends the night with Kelly at No.1. Emily Bishop (Eileen Derbyshire) sees Ashley leaving No.1 in the morning and realises that he spent the night with Kelly. Ken returns from the course to find Ashley wearing his dressing gown. Emily is annoyed when Ashley accuses her of telling Ken about him staying the night with Kelly. Emily tells Ken that she's not going to tell tales on Kelly but admits Ashley stayed the night.  Kelly and Ashley have to cancel an evening out in Blackpool as Ken has an emergency meeting. Ashley tells Kelly that Ken puts on her but she accuses him of being selfish. Ashley apologises to Kelly and tells her that he's fed up as they never get any privacy.  Ashley asks for time off as he has enteritis. However, Fred discovers that he's helping Kelly to move into Ken's house. A row ensues and Ashley gets fired. Ashley refuses to make amends with Fred. Kelly asks Rita to persuade Fred to take Ashley back as Ashley's too scared to approach Fred. Rita asks Fred to give Ashley a second chance but he tells her to let him run his business his way. She is put out. Rita explains to Kelly that she had no luck with Fred in getting Ashley's job back. Fred reinstates Ashley.

Ashley doesn't like his mother's boyfriend Trevor and feels they want him to leave home. Kelly tells Ashley that Don Brennan (Geoffrey Hinsliff) needs a lodger and it would be handy as it's only two doors from her. Don shows Ashley around No.5. Ashley likes it but Kelly is wary of Don. Kelly thinks that No.5 isn't the right house for Ashley as she doesn't like Don.  Ashley moves into No.5. Don tells him that now he has his rent money he doesn't need to work so many night shifts. Ashley is disappointed as he was hoping to entertain Kelly. Ashley's plans to go out with Kelly are spoiled when Don drags him onto a poker game. Kelly is furious when he stands her up as he enjoys the game and wins the others money.  Don advises Ashley to be masterful with Kelly. Ashley tells Kelly that he's not weak and is stunned when she slams the door in his face. Kelly is upset that Ashley is trying to act macho. Fred is annoyed by the new masterful Ashley and blames Kelly for changing him but she tells him that it's Don's fault.  Fred advises Ashley to show Kelly he's the boss by grabbing her for a kiss. Kelly is pleased when Ashley kisses her passionately and apologises but he oversteps the mark when he tells her to shut up so she slams the door on him again. Kelly and Ashley make-up and she admits that she does enjoy it when he's forceful. Kelly tells Ashley that she fears she'll have to go home to her parents and hints about them getting a flat together but he doesn't pick up on the hint as he likes his independence at No.5. Kelly moves back home with Ashley's help. Ashley and Kelly have a tearful farewell when she leaves for Scotland. He gives her a charm bracelet to remember him by. Don breaks open Ashley's present to him - a bottle of whisky. Ashley keeps Don company. Ashley brings Don out of himself by talking to him about gambling.

After his relationship with Kelly ends, Ashley is involved in an on-off relationship with Maxine Heavey (Tracy Shaw). Eventually, Maxine moves in with Ashley at No.4 - Fred's house. When teenage runaway Zoe Tattersall (Joanne Froggatt) comes to Coronation Street, Ashley feels sorry for her and allows her to move in but Maxine is uncomfortable with the arrangement and leaves. Eventually Ashley falls in love with Zoe and sets out to be a provider for her and her baby daughter, Shannon. However, Zoe exploits Ashley's good nature and runs off to join a cult after Shannon dies of meningitis.

In 1999, Ashley and Maxine get back together, and finally marry in September. Ashley also finds out that his uncle, Fred, is actually his biological father. Fred tells Ashley about Kathleen and her reluctance to be a mother at a young age. Fred also explains to Ashley that Beryl, who he believed to be his mother, is actually his aunt, and that Fred let her raise Ashley so he could watch him grow up. Ashley decides that he wants to meet his birth mother but Fred begs him not to, believing it would hurt Beryl. Ashley, however, tracks Kathleen down to her home in Oldham. He is initially very bitter towards her for abandoning him but they reconcile and Ashley lets Kathleen attend his and Maxine's wedding.

Ashley and Maxine decide to have a baby and after months of trying, it is discovered that Ashley needs minor surgery. While he is in hospital overnight, Maxine gets drunk and has a one-night stand with local doctor Matt Ramsden (Stephen Beckett) and subsequently becomes pregnant with his child. When Joshua (Benjamin Beresford) is born in 2002, Maxine lets Ashley believe that he is the father and Ashley is named on the birth certificate. Maxine tells Ashley the truth and he is hurt and betrayed by her actions, but he forgives her and agrees to raise Joshua as his son and asks her never to reveal to anybody that he is not Joshua's biological father. In January 2003, Maxine is murdered by Richard Hillman (Brian Capron), leaving Ashley devastated. At Maxine's funeral, her boss Audrey Roberts (Sue Nicholls) causes a scene and accuses Richard of murdering Maxine and attempting to kill her and Emily. Later at the wake in The Rovers', Ashley is very angry with Audrey and does not accept her apology. However, he accepts the support of Audrey's daughter, Gail (Helen Worth), Richard's wife. Ashley is further devastated when a blood test confirms that Matt is indeed Joshua's biological father.

Ashley realizes that he needs help looking after Joshua and hires a nanny, Claire Casey (Julia Haworth). Ashley and Claire bond over Joshua and they eventually fall in love. In October 2004, Ashley proposes to Claire in The Rovers and she accepts. They get married on Christmas Day 2004. In November 2005, Fred challenges another butcher, Eddie Maddocks, to a boxing match between Ashley and Eddie's son, Marvin, a local boxing champion. On the day of the fight, Fred drops a weight on Ashley's foot and he is hospitalised. Ashley recovers and goes ahead with the fight but a riot breaks out amongst the spectators. In order to restore order, Ashley and Marvin agree on a tie.

On their first wedding anniversary in December 2005, Claire tells Ashley that she is pregnant. Their son Thomas is born on 17 July 2006. Around the same time, Matt contacts Ashley and demands access to Joshua. Ashley refuses and the matter goes to court. Eventually, Claire persuades Ashley to make Matt an offer of limited access which he accepts but ends up delivering Claire's baby when she goes into labour and congratulates Ashley on becoming a father himself. Ashley supports Claire when she suffers from post-natal depression and is sectioned after trying to kill Thomas. Ashley stands by Claire during her ordeal and they reconcile when she is allowed home.

In October 2006, Ashley is devastated when Fred dies of a stroke. Fred was due to marry Bev Unwin (Susie Blake) but visited his former lover, Audrey's, house. Although Ashley swore that Fred and Audrey were not having an affair, not everyone believed him. Ashley had to cope with losing his father and people gossiping about why Fred had been at Audrey's house. Ashley blamed Audrey for Fred's death because she told him that she loved him and wished he was marrying her instead of Bev. Ashley is comforted by Claire who suggests that they rename their son Freddie, in Fred's honour. Ashley takes over the running of his father's shop.

In May 2007, whilst Ashley and Joshua visit Maxine's parents, the Peacocks' house is set on fire. Claire is rescued but Freddie is missing and is later found in a local park. Claire suspects her former friend Casey Carswell (Zoe Henry) but Ashley does not believe her. One day whilst Claire is out, Ashley kisses Casey and they agree to forget it ever happened. However, Casey has no intention of forgetting anything, manipulating Ashley into having an affair. They are almost caught when Claire returns from a trauma support group. Feeling guilty about his affair, Ashley tells Audrey and Kevin Webster (Michael Le Vell). Ashley decides to make his marriage work and ends things with Casey but, adamant that Ashley loves her, Casey pesters him constantly. Claire becomes suspicious, as Casey had stayed with Ashley while she was away, and she asks Ashley if he had slept with Casey but he denies it. Casey becomes obsessed with Ashley and is prepared to do anything to get his attention, eventually kidnapping Freddie and takes him to her house, knowing Ashley would come to get him. When Ashley arrives, he is horrified to see Casey has photos of him everywhere. He tries to reason with her but Claire barges in and Audrey, who also accompanied them, calls the police. Claire talks to Casey and she reveals her affair with Ashley. Claire rescues Freddie, and Casey is arrested and admits starting the fire at the Peacocks' house. After Ashley and Casey's affair is revealed, Claire tells Ashley that their marriage is over. He moves out, staying briefly with the Websters before moving in with Audrey, Bill Webster (Peter Armitage) and her grandson, David Platt (Jack P. Shepherd). Ashley sees Joshua and Freddie regularly but it is clear that Claire is angry and hurt by his actions. She struggles with childcare and work but cannot bring herself to forgive Ashley until Audrey convinces her to do so and the couple reconcile.

During 2008, Claire is shocked to discover that she and Ashley are struggling financially. Ashley confesses to using their savings to keep the butcher's shop going so Claire discusses housing options with Sally when she mentions that her daughters, Rosie (Helen Flanagan) and Sophie Webster (Brooke Vincent), are getting too old to share a room. Ashley and Claire's sons are young enough for room sharing not to be a problem so Claire and Sally decide to swap houses. Initially, Ashley and Kevin are reluctant to move but are persuaded to do so by their wives. The couples agree to value the houses and the Websters agree to give the Peacocks the difference in cash. Eventually, the purchase price is agreed and both families move.

In July 2009, Claire is rushed into hospital after collapsing due to a near-fatal blood clot, brought on by a miscarriage. Claire and Ashley were unaware that Claire was pregnant. During her recovery, Claire decides not to have any more children and insists Ashley have a vasectomy. He agrees but when he arrives at the clinic for the surgery, he changes his mind and goes home, telling Claire that he has had it done. Eventually however, he tells her the truth, causing tension between the couple; eventually he agrees to have the operation.

On 10 November 2008, Ashley employs Graeme Proctor (Craig Gazey) at his shop following the teenager's release from a Young Offenders Institution and he and Ashley form a close bond and friendship. Since Autumn 2009, Ashley developed a friendship with Steve McDonald (Simon Gregson) due to Claire's newly developed friendship with Steve's wife, Becky (Katherine Kelly).

In August 2010, Claire is babysitting Joshua, Freddie, Aadi Alahan (Zennon Ditchett), Asha Alahan (Tanisha Gorey) and Simon Barlow (Alex Bain). She is forced to leave the children when her mother is taken ill and asks Sophie and Sian Powers (Sacha Parkinson) to watch the children. Whilst she is gone, Aadi and Simon have a fight and Aadi hits his head and later collapses and is rushed to hospital. He recovers and Aadi's parents, Dev (Jimmi Harkishin) and Sunita Alahan (Shobna Gulati), tell the police Claire was babysitting. When Claire is questioned, she tells the police about Sophie and Sian babysitting. Claire later tells Ashley she is concerned that her past mental health problems will be brought up but he reassures her that she has nothing to worry about. The Peacocks are angry with the Alahans for telling the police about Claire. After the police question Sophie and Sian, Sally confronts the Peacocks at Roy (David Neilson) and Hayley Cropper's (Julie Hesmondhalgh) wedding and accuses Claire of using the girls as a scapegoat and causing Aadi's injury herself and mocks her former mental health problems. Claire then reveals that Sophie and Sian are lesbians and that she saw them kissing after returning home but the girls deny it. Ashley and Claire leave the ceremony and Claire shouts at Sophie as they walk past her for letting everyone believe that she is a liar.

Claire then goes to stay with her mother and leaves Joshua and Freddie with Ashley. Ashley is angry with Sunita when she comes into the butchers to ask after Claire and he orders her to leave. When the truth is revealed about Simon causing Aadi's injury, Ashley angrily confronts Simon's father Peter Barlow (Chris Gascoyne) and accuses Simon of lying to cover his tracks and causing Claire's problems. Peter apologises to Ashley. When Claire returns home, Sunita comes round to apologize but the Peacocks do not accept it and Ashley orders Sunita to leave.

In order to put her ordeal behind her, Claire asks Ashley if they can move away from Weatherfield for a fresh start. Ashley is reluctant at first but agrees. However, Claire's mother Yvonne (Yvonne O'Grady) later visits and she convinces Claire to move to France, where she lives. Claire is enthusiastic and agrees but Ashley changes his mind about moving, not wanting to leave the country.

In October 2010, Ashley is closing the butcher's shop when he witnesses Graeme get run over by his former friend David. Ashley calls an ambulance and has to restrain Graeme's girlfriend, Tina McIntyre (Michelle Keegan), David's ex-girlfriend, from attacking David. Ashley and Claire accompany Graeme to the hospital and Ashley believes Claire is having second thoughts about leaving. Ashley is angry with David and accuses him of deliberately running Graeme over, saying some horrible things. However, upon learning that David had an epileptic fit at the wheel and did not mean to run Graeme over, he feels guilty and apologises off-screen.

In order to change Ashley's mind about moving, Claire arranges a romantic meal for them but Ashley realises that she is trying to win him round when he notices that the food and wine is French. Ashley refuses to move again, but suddenly feels a pain in his chest. Believing he is having a heart attack, Claire rushes him to hospital. Ashley discovers that he was suffering from indigestion but he does not tell Claire this and he lets her continue thinking that he has heart problems in order for her to change her mind about moving and it works. Ashley is given indigestion tablets and removes them from their packet and puts them in a biscuit tin in the kitchen. Later, Joshua feeds Freddie one of Ashley's pills and Claire panics and takes Freddie to hospital. Ashley is forced to admit that the tablets were for indigestion and not heart problems. When Claire returns home she apologises to Ashley for forcing him to move and tells him that she will move to France alone, with Joshua and Freddie and leave him behind.

Ashley is forced to sleep on the sofa and later gets drunk in The Rovers. Graeme and Tina take him home and let him spend the night at their flat in order to sleep off his hangover. Ashley attends Jack Dobbs' christening and Jack Duckworth (Bill Tarmey) asks him how things are between him and Claire. Ashley is forced to admit that his marriage may be over but Jack convinces Ashley to speak to Claire and he does so in The Rovers but they end up arguing again.

Jack dies from cancer two weeks later and at his funeral, Ashley comforts Claire. At Jack's wake, Ashley and Claire reconcile and he agrees to move to France with her. Ashley tells Graeme he will be selling the shop. Graeme is upset but wishes Ashley and Claire well.

On 6 December 2010, Ashley attends Peter's stag night at The Joinery Bar. Ashley gets drunk and decides to go home. He goes into the office to say goodbye to Peter. He wishes Peter well and tells him never to turn his back on his fiancée Leanne Battersby (Jane Danson). He also asks Peter to come and visit himself and Claire in France once they have settled down and the two men embrace. An explosion then tears through The Joinery, severing the overhead railway line and derailing a tram. Ashley is trapped in the office with Peter and bar manager Nick Tilsley (Ben Price). He then helps Nick free Peter who is buried under debris and badly injured. Ashley tries to search for a way out and realises he is seriously injured when he coughs up blood. He then tries to call Claire but gets no reply. He leaves a message on her phone telling her that he loves her and is looking forward to going to France with her and the boys. Ashley and Nick then manage to carry Peter to a hole in the wall after hearing firefighters call out to them. The roof starts to collapse and Ashley is trapped but holds the ceiling up long enough for Nick to pass Peter out to safety. Nick offers to stay behind and help Ashley but realising it is too late to save himself, Ashley shouts at Nick to get out and save himself. The roof then gives way and Ashley is crushed to death. Claire then listens to the voicemail that Ashley left her whilst he was trapped in the joinery.
 
A distraught Claire then goes with Graeme to identify Ashley's body at the morgue. Ashley's funeral was held on 16 December 2010, off-screen. The character has been referred to several times since his death.

Development

Departure

The Peacocks' departure tied in with the show's 50th anniversary celebrations. The anniversary episode was broadcast live on 9 December 2010, with Ashley being killed-off in an explosion, taking place at The Joinery, which caused a tram to derail onto the street. The character made his final ever appearance on the programme on 10 December 2010, ending his fifteen-year association on the soap.

Following his departure, Arnold claimed that he believed his character's death was as of a result of his "boozing" and "bad time-keeping", which resulted in him receiving multiple warnings over his lack of professionalism.

Reception
For his portrayal of Ashley, Arnold was nominated in the category of "Most Popular Actor" at the 1999 National Television Awards. Steven Arnold was nominated in the category of Best Actor at the Inside Soap Awards.

References

External links 

Ashley Peacock at What's on TV

Coronation Street characters
Fictional butchers
Fictional businesspeople
Television characters introduced in 1995
Male characters in television